The Polynesian Resort Hotel is a water park resort located in Wisconsin Dells, Wisconsin. It was opened in 1989 and became the Wisconsin Dells's first indoor waterpark in 1994.

Overview
The resort is built around a tropical theme based on the Polynesian islands. Compared to its surrounding resorts and hotels, The Polynesian Resort Hotel is one of the smaller resorts in the Wisconsin Dells. It has a combined total of 200,000 square feet of indoor and outdoor waterpark, a restaurant, and an arcade.

References

External links
Polynesian Resort Hotel

Water parks in Wisconsin
Wisconsin Dells, Wisconsin